William Lewis Owens (born January 20, 1949) is an American attorney and former U.S. Representative from New York, a post he held from 2009 to 2015. He is a member of the Democratic Party and currently serves on the advisory board of the Canadian American Business Council. The district he represented, the state's largest and most rural, includes most of the North Country, as well as the northern suburbs of Syracuse.

On January 14, 2014, Owens announced he would not seek re-election in 2014.

Early life and education
Born in Brooklyn to Lewis Owens and Alice Stanton Owens, Owens was raised in Mineola, New York. After graduating from Chaminade High School, where he was a classmate of television host and conservative political commentator Bill O'Reilly. Owens earned a Bachelor of Business Administration from Manhattan College in 1971 and a Juris Doctor from the Fordham University School of Law in 1974.

Career

Military service 
After graduating from high school, he enlisted in the U.S. Air Force and was stationed at Plattsburgh Air Force Base. He returned to the North Country and has lived there for over 30 years after serving as a United States Air Force captain.

Legal work
Before coming to Congress, Owens was a managing partner at Stafford, Owens, Piller, Murnane & Trombley, where he specialized in business law, international law, and estate and tax law. He is also an adjunct professor in business law at State University of New York at Plattsburgh. In 2004, he was appointed by Governor George Pataki to the College Council at that university. He served as the host for Business Affairs on WCFE-TV, a PBS television station in Plattsburgh. According to financial disclosure forms filed when he ran for Congress, Owens made $751,000 in 2008, mostly from his law practice.

When the Plattsburgh Air Force Base closed in 1995, Owens helped create and worked for the Plattsburgh Airbase Redevelopment Corporation (formerly the Plattsburgh Inter-municipal Development Council), which recruited private companies to reuse the space. The base is now home to companies such as Bombardier Inc., a passenger railway car maker. Plattsburgh Airbase Redevelopment Corporation attests that more than 2,000 jobs were created at the site since the military left.

U.S. House of Representatives

Elections
2009

On August 10, 2009, the Democratic Party of New York's 23rd congressional district chose Owens to run in a special election to fill the House seat vacated by the incumbent Republican John McHugh, who had resigned to take a post as the Secretary of the Army. Because he was a registered independent at the time, Owens had to obtain the signatures of all 11 Democratic county chairs in the district to allow him to run as a Democrat.

Originally, Owens faced Republican Assemblywoman Dede Scozzafava and Doug Hoffman, an accountant from Lake Placid who was running as a third party candidate on the single ballot line of the Conservative Party of New York after failing to also get the Republican Party nomination. “The race,” wrote Valerie Bauman of the Associated Press, “received national attention, with some calling it a referendum on Obama and others saying it could help Republicans focus their message to attract more people to the party.” Bauman said that “Despite the fervor that surrounded Hoffman in the final week of the campaign, Owens managed to appeal to the voters with his talk of job creation and the need for more federal support for Fort Drum (an army base in the district) and farmers.” Scozzafava was a social liberal, and high-profile conservatives such as Rush Limbaugh, Sarah Palin, and Michelle Malkin threw their support behind Hoffman, who enjoyed Tea Party support. Under pressure from conservative elements in her party, who saw “Doug Hoffman as the man who would save them,” according to the San Francisco Chronicle, Scozzafava dropped out of the race on October 31, the weekend before the election. Hoffman then became Owens's sole opponent. The Watertown Daily Times, which had originally endorsed Scozzafava, switched its endorsement to Owens on November 1. Later on November 1, Scozzafava endorsed Owens. In the special election, Owens won 49 percent of the vote to 45 percent for Hoffman and 6 percent for Scozzafava. Owens was sworn in on November 6, 2009. He became the first Democrat to represent what was, in 2009, the 23rd since 1873.

2010

Owens almost immediately announced that he would run for a full term in 2010. He campaigned largely on “creating jobs throughout his district, attracting foreign manufacturers, taking care of veterans, and ensuring that Fort Drum (an Army installation located in the district) is preserved.” Owens won his re-election bid with a second consecutive minority plurality of 47.5% of the vote against Republican and Independence nominee Matt Doheny and Conservative nominee Doug Hoffman, becoming the first Democrat to win a full term in the North Country district in 138 years.

The election was one of the ten closest Congressional races that year.

2012

Owens ran for reelection in 2012 in the renumbered 21st District. He faced a rematch against Doheny and was elected to a second full term, albeit narrowly.

Tenure
During his campaign, Owens said he would focus on creating jobs throughout his district, attracting foreign manufacturers, taking care of veterans, and ensuring that Fort Drum is preserved. He has called for deeper federal budget cuts (including 3% cuts across the board for federal agencies), co-sponsored the Budget Process Improvement Act of 2011, and said that the Bush-era tax cuts need to be allowed to expire for people earning over $500,000. Owens is the second thriftiest member of Congress, with staff expenses of $713,969.

Owens has consistently voted for legislation to build the controversial Keystone Pipeline to carry tar sand oil across the United States from Canada for export to foreign nations.

As a congressman, Owens first authored piece of legislation was the  Rural Jobs Tax Credit Act, a bill that, if passed, would create a 15% tax incentive in 2010 for businesses that hire or expand their payroll in rural areas, and a 10% tax incentive for firms that do the same in 2011.

On December 14, 2011, Marc Heller reported that Sen. Claire McCaskill had accused Owens and other members of the House Armed Services Committee “of loading up an annual defense bill with pork-barrel projects despite a congressional ban on home-state 'earmarks.'” Owens's earmarks “included construction at Fort Drum and $500,000 intended for the Fort Drum Regional Health Planning Organization.”

Gay Marriage
In August 2009, Owens stated that he supported civil unions and believed marriage should be legally recognized as one man one woman. Owens opposes any federal action on marriage, which he called a "states rights issue". In July 2011, after the New York State legislature passed a bill recognizing same-sex marriage in New York, Owens became a co-sponsor of the Respect for Marriage Act, which would repeal the federal Defense of Marriage Act.

Labor
He supports the Employee Free Choice Act.

Health Care
Owens voted for the Affordable Health Care for America Act on November 7, 2009. He voted against the Stupak Amendment which proposed to restrict abortion funding in the federal health insurance exchanges. He voted for the Patient Protection and Affordable Care Act on March 21, 2010, and for the Health Care and Education Reconciliation Act of 2010 to incorporate certain agreed-upon changes with the Senate.

Internet policy
In 2011, Rep. Owens became a co-sponsor of Bill H.R.3261 otherwise known as the Stop Online Piracy Act.

 GMO crops
Owens is a member of the House Committee on Agriculture and voted for the Farmer Assurance Provision. Owens says that he is "still doing the fact-finding" when it comes to Monsanto and GMO crops. "I have farmers who are telling me it's a great thing. I have people telling me that it's the worst thing in the world."

The Monsanto Citizenship Fund from Monsanto donated $1,500 on June 24, 2013 to Owens' 2014 campaign.

Committee assignments
United States House of Representatives Committee on Appropriations'''
United States House Appropriations Subcommittee on Defense
United States House Appropriations Subcommittee on Homeland Security

Source: House Appropriations Committee

Caucus memberships
Congressional Biomass Caucus
Congressional Center Aisle Caucus
Congressional Northern Border Caucus (Co-Chair)
International Conservation Caucus
Sportsmen's Caucus
Congressional Cement Caucus

Personal life
Owens and his wife Jane have three children and six grandchildren. Jane was an early childhood education teacher and is currently the Director of Education and Outreach for Mountain Lake PBS in Plattsburgh. He is a Roman Catholic.

References

External links

 

1949 births
Businesspeople from New York (state)
Fordham University School of Law alumni
Living people
Manhattan College alumni
New York (state) lawyers
People from Brooklyn
Politicians from Plattsburgh, New York
People from Mineola, New York
State University of New York at Plattsburgh faculty
Democratic Party members of the United States House of Representatives from New York (state)
21st-century American politicians